Ephormortis is a genus of moths of the family Crambidae.

Species
Ephormotris cataclystalis (Hampson, 1897)
Ephormotris dilucidalis (Guérin-Méneville, 1832)

Former species
Ephormotris nyasalis (Hampson, 1917)

References

 , 1999: Catalogue of the Oriental Acentropinae (Lepidoptera: Crambidae). Tijdschrift voor Entomologie 142 (1): 125-142. Full article: .

Acentropinae
Crambidae genera
Taxa named by Edward Meyrick